The Central Water Catchment, also known as the Central Catchment Area, is a designated planning area and one of the two main water catchments of Singapore. The country's main reservoirs – MacRitchie, Upper Seletar, Upper Peirce and Lower Peirce – are in the central catchment area.

The Central Water Catchment lies in the geographical centre of the city, and is largely home to the Central Catchment Nature Reserve which houses several other recreational sites, including the Singapore Zoo, the Night Safari and the River Safari.

Wildlife
MacRitchie Reservoir has resident animals such as birds, monkeys and monitor lizards. The HSBC Treetop Walk, a one-way suspension bridge, is a common place for birdwatchers and tourists to go.

The monkeys at MacRitchie Reservoir are infamous for attacking people as they are aggressive creatures and will take any opportunity to attack people for food, self-defence or in agitation triggered by intimidation. One woman needed to get thirteen stitches on her finger as a result of the attack. The National Parks Board has put up signs all over MacRitchie Reservoir teaching people on what to do when they encounter monkeys.

Birds such as the white-bellied eagle can be found in the Upper Seletar Reservoir.

References

 
North Region, Singapore
Important Bird Areas of Singapore